The Parliamentary Under-Secretary of State for Justice and Tackling Illegal Migration, previously known as Parliamentary Under-Secretary of State for Immigration Compliance and Courts, is a junior role in both the British Home Office and the Ministry of Justice. It is currently held by Simon Baynes MP who took the office on 8 July 2022 after the cabinet reshuffle.

Responsibilities 
The minister has the following responsibilities:

For the Home Office:

 access to work, benefits and services
 detention
 returns
 foreign national offenders
 illegal immigration strategy
 overseas development aid
 Immigration Enforcement
 asylum
 resettlement
 casework
 animals (illegal wildlife trade)
 sponsorship of Border Force and immigration enforcement directorates
 supporting Lords Minister on corporate affairs, including the Spending Review and Budget
 COVID-19 impacts on business as usual function of asylum and returns systems, detention and Border Force

For the Ministry of Justice:

 foreign national offenders and removing barriers to removal
 immigration system legal reform
 joint Spending Review bids (working with Kit Malthouse)
 immigration crime sentencing reform
 detained fast track
 court and tribunal services and reform
 court and tribunal fees
 administrative justice
 supporting the Secretary of State on departmental finance

List of officeholders 

 Chris Philp (10 September 2019 to 16 September 2021)
 Tom Pursglove (17 September 2021 to 7 July 2022)

References 

Home Office (United Kingdom)
Lists of government ministers of the United Kingdom
Ministry of Justice (United Kingdom)
Immigration ministers
Ministerial offices in the United Kingdom